Mamam River is a small river located in the Thiruvananthapuram district. of Kerala, India. Malayalam: മാമം പുഴ. It originates from the Pandalakode hills  in Thiruvananthapuram and flows 27 km  westwards into the Anchuthengu lake. The river basin is 144 km long. One side of Attingal is surrounded by this river. Vamanapuram, Mamom and Ayirur rivers form the Vamanapuram drainage basin with a total catchment area of 867 sq.km 

This river flows along the southern part of Mudakkal panchayath and splits at Andoorkonam in Attingal. This branch flows westwards and joins the Vamanapuram river. The other branch flows south, crosses Enchakal, turns west and joins Anchuthengu Lake. The Changanam checkdam is located on this branch.

References

Rivers of Thiruvananthapuram district